Mahmudabad (also Romanized as Maḩmūdābād; also known as Maḩmūābād, Maḩmūdābād-e Tāzeh Kand, and Makhmudabad) is a village in Qareh Poshtelu-e Bala Rural District, Qareh Poshtelu District, Zanjan County, Zanjan Province, Iran. At the 2006 census, its population was 265, in 53 families.

References 

Populated places in Zanjan County